Puerto Morazán is a municipality in the Chinandega department of Nicaragua.

International relations

Twin towns – Sister cities
Puerto Morazán is twinned with:

References
Notes

Municipalities of the Chinandega Department